The Bulletin des lois (Bulletin of the laws) was a publication created during the French Revolution, as an "official anthology of the laws, orders and regulations that govern" the people.  It was created by the decree of 14 Frimaire of year II of the French Republican calendar (December 4, 1793).

In the horrible and bloody disorder of Reign of Terror, the National Convention and the Committee of Public Safety, concerned with channeling and coordinating their actions, felt it necessary to create an organ by which to get news of votes in Paris to various scattered parts of the administration, notably those in the provinces.  It was for this purpose that the Bulletin was created.  A commission was specially created to supervise the sending-out of this publication to all the towns.  The first issue of the Bulletin des lois appeared on 22 prairial of year II (June 10, 1794). Publication continued until 1931.

References

Newspapers of the French Revolution